The county of Bregenz is recorded as part of the Holy Roman Empire between 1043 and 1160. It was in possession of the Udalriching family, who took the titles of counts of Bregenz.

After 1160, Bregenz fell to the counts of Montfort-Bregenz (1160 to 1338), a cadet branch of the counts of Montfort, Montfort-Tettnang-Bregenz (1354 to 1451). After 1451 the title of count of Bregenz was held by the House of Habsburg and Bregenz was incorporated into the duchy of Austria. The nominal title of count of Bregenz was kept as part of the grand title of the Emperor of Austria until 1918.

Counts of Bregenz
Counts of Bregenz (Udalriching):
   Ulrich VI, d. 950/957, count in Bregenz, count in Raetia
   Ulrich IX, d. before  1079, count of Bregenz, count in  Argengau and Nibelgau
   Ulrich X, d. 1097, count of Bregenz 
   Rudolf I, d. 1160, count of Bregenz, count in Lower Raetia, count of Chur

Afterwards the head of the House of Habsburg carried the title.

See also  
Duchy of Swabia
Churraetia
Counts of Montfort
Further Austria

References

Joseph Zösmair: Geschichte Rudolfs des letzten der alten Grafen von Bregenz (1097-1160), in: Schriften des Vereins für Geschichte des Bodensees und seiner Umgebung  44 (1915),  25–39 (online copy)

History of Vorarlberg
Duchy of Swabia
Bregenz
Udalriching dynasty